Khaneh-ye Hay Khvasti (also Romanized as Khāneh-ye Hāy Khvāstī; also known as Khāneh Khvāstī) is a village in Dust Mohammad Rural District, in the Central District of Hirmand County, Sistan and Baluchestan Province, Iran. At the 2006 census, its population was 33, in 8 families.

References 

Populated places in Hirmand County